The Queen's Commonwealth Canopy (QCC) is an initiative begun in 2015 as a network of forest conservation programmes throughout the 54 countries of the Commonwealth of Nations. By 2016, 16 countries had become involved, and by 2019 the number was 46.

Origins

The idea was conceived by UK Member of Parliament Frank Field in the 2000s, but was met by apathy from the political establishment. When he raised the idea at a Buckingham Palace meeting the concept found support from Queen Elizabeth II.

Launch
The initiative was officially launched at the 2015 Commonwealth Heads of Government Meeting in Malta. Its aim is to establish a global network of protected woodland. The three organisations behind the project are The Royal Commonwealth Society, the Commonwealth Forestry Association, and Cool Earth.

Progress

In April 2018, ITV broadcast The Queen's Green Planet, highlighting many of the initiatives around the world, interspersed with footage of The Queen and Sir David Attenborough discussing trees in Buckingham Palace's gardens. By this time, more than 40 countries had committed to taking part in the initiative. By mid-2019, the number had reached 46 countries.

Projects

See also
 The Queen's Green Canopy
 Queen Elizabeth Diamond Jubilee Wood

References

External links
 Queen's Commonwealth Canopy website

Commonwealth of Nations
Forest conservation organizations
Protected areas established in 2015
Elizabeth II